Walter Rodrigo González Sosa (born 21 June 1995) is a Paraguayan footballer who plays for Santa Clara on loan from Club Olimpia.

International career
he was summoned for Paraguay national under-20 football team   to play 2015 South American Youth Football Championship.

References

External links
 
 clubolimpia.com.py
 

1995 births
People from Alto Paraná Department
Living people
Paraguayan footballers
Paraguay under-20 international footballers
Association football forwards
Club Olimpia footballers
F.C. Arouca players
C.F. Pachuca players
Club León footballers
Everton de Viña del Mar footballers
C.D. Santa Clara players
Paraguayan Primera División players
Primeira Liga players
Liga MX players
Chilean Primera División players
2015 South American Youth Football Championship players
Paraguayan expatriate footballers
Expatriate footballers in Portugal
Paraguayan expatriate sportspeople in Portugal
Expatriate footballers in Mexico
Paraguayan expatriate sportspeople in Mexico
Expatriate footballers in Chile
Paraguayan expatriate sportspeople in Chile